Antherostele is a genus of flowering plants in the family Rubiaceae. It is endemic to the Philippines.

Species
 Antherostele banahaensis (Elmer) Bremek. - Luzon
 Antherostele callophylla Bremek. - Luzon
 Antherostele grandistipula (Merr.) Bremek. - Leyte
 Antherostele luzoniensis (Merr.) Bremek. - Luzon

References

External links 
 Antherostele in the World Checklist of Rubiaceae

Rubiaceae genera
Urophylleae
Endemic flora of the Philippines